"Let's Not" is a science fiction short story by American writer Isaac Asimov.  It was first published in Boston University Graduate Journal in December 1954. It was written for no payment as a favor to the journal, and later appeared in the 1975 collection Buy Jupiter and Other Stories.

Plot summary

Two scientists, who have taken refuge below the surface of Mars together with a hundred others, discuss what Earth used to be like before it was destroyed by nuclear war. They hope to re-establish their teaching and in time repopulate the dead radioactive surface of Earth.

External links
 

Short stories by Isaac Asimov
1954 short stories
Works originally published in American magazines